Gronau (Westf) is a railway station  in the town of Gronau, North Rhine-Westphalia, Germany. The station lies on the Dortmund–Enschede railway and Münster–Enschede railway and the train services are operated by Deutsche Bahn. The line between Enschede and Gronau was closed in 1981 and re-opened in 2001. To the west of the station are 3 sidings.

Train services
The station is served by the following services:

regional service  Enschede - Gronau - Coesfeld - Lünen - Dortmund
regional service  Enschede - Gronau - Münster

Bus services
The following bus services serve the station:

R77	Gronau - Nienborg - Heek - Ahaus
174	Gronau - Ochtrup - Burgsteinfurt
182	Gronau - Ochtrup
400	Gronau - Gildehaus - Bad Bentheim - Nordhorn
781	Gronau - Ahaus - Legden - Coesfeld
882	Gronau - Gildehauser Str + Butenland (Town service)
883	Gronau - Buterland + Gildehauser Str (Town service)

Gallery

References

External links

Deutsche Bahn website

Railway stations in North Rhine-Westphalia
Railway stations in Germany opened in 1875
Gronau, North Rhine-Westphalia